René Clausen (born 1953) is an American composer, conductor emeritus of The Concordia Choir, and professor of music at Concordia College in Moorhead, Minnesota. His works are widely performed by high school and church choirs while his more technically demanding pieces have been performed and recorded by college and professional choirs. Among his many accolades, his recent recording, "Life & Breath: Choral Works by René Clausen," received three Grammy Awards at the 55th Grammy Awards in 2013.

Clausen is a frequent guest conductor, guest composer and lecturer, both nationally and internationally. He has conducted All-State choirs in more than 15 states. Prior to his appointment as conductor of The Concordia Choir, Clausen was director of choral activities at West Texas State University, Canyon, Texas, and assistant professor of choral music at Wichita State University. He also served as senior editor of Mark Foster Music Company and as interim conductor of the National Lutheran Choir of Minneapolis.

Dr. René Clausen announced that he will retire following the 2019-20 academic year, concluding his service as professor of music and conductor of The Concordia Choir.

Education
Raised in California, Clausen graduated from Wilton Senior High School in Wilton, Iowa, holds an undergraduate degree from St. Olaf College, Northfield, Minnesota, and received the Master of Music and Doctor of Musical Arts degrees in choral conducting from the University of Illinois at Urbana-Champaign.

Composition style
Clausen's compositional style is varied and eclectic, and put to sacred as well as secular texts. He has created compositions and arrangements that range over many artistic media including choral, orchestral, wind ensemble, film, video, and solo voice. Clausen's most popular harmonies are mostly based on close dissonances such as the major and minor second. These chords based on dissonance are also called "tone clusters". His style is sometimes classified as Neo-Romantic but this term can mean many things. All of his works are unmistakably tonal yet they push the boundaries of chordal language. The traditional functions of choral progression are blurred by his use of tone clusters. These ideas are mostly exhibited in pieces such as "Tonight, Eternity Alone", "Magnificat", and "I Thank You God". Less difficult pieces exhibit the same structure as any classical or baroque choral piece with a hint of romantic rubato and expression but largely, very traditional chord progressions.

Selected compositions and arrangements

Santa Barbara Music Publishing

						

Additional music is available from other publishers.

Available recordings of compositions

Discography
NOTE: Clausen's compositions and arrangements are published by Shawnee Press in the Mark Foster Catalog, Santa Barbara Music Publishing, Roger Dean Publishing Company and Augsburg Publishing House.
A New Creation
The Choral Music of René Clausen
Memorial

A New Creation
Recorded in 1990 by the Dale Warland Singers, conducted by the composer, this sacred cantata uses both English and Latin texts.  "Set Me as a Seal," one of the last movements, has been excerpted and widely performed on its own.

Memorial
Memorial was written for the 2003 Brock Commission from the American Choral Directors Association. It is a composition for mixed chorus, orchestra and baritone solo, based on subject material, which reflects the horrific events of September 11, 2001, in New York City. Though presented as one continuous movement, the composition follows a program that consists of four sub-sections - September Morning, The Premonition, The Attack, and Prayers & Petitions. The baritone soloist is Peter Halverson (a Concordia College Music Faculty member), the soprano soloist is opera singer (then student) Molly Mustonen. On this CD, there is also an exceptional performance of Samuel Barber's instrumental piece, "Adagio for Strings", performed by the Concordia College Orchestra.

References

External links
René Clausen Biography
René Clausen Biography
René Clausen Biography
Clausen's works at a-cappella.com
The Choral Music of René Clausen
 Recordings 

1953 births
American male composers
21st-century American composers
Living people
American choral conductors
American male conductors (music)
St. Olaf College alumni
University of Illinois at Urbana–Champaign School of Music alumni
Singers from Iowa
21st-century American conductors (music)
21st-century American male musicians